Kpankpande is a village in north-western Togo, in the Bassar Prefecture of the Kara Region adjacent to the border with Ghana.

References

External links
Satellite map at Maplandia.com

Populated places in Kara Region
Bassar Prefecture